Irish orthography is very etymological, which allows the same written form to represent all dialects of Irish and remain regular. The reform removed inter-dialectal silent letters, simplified some letter sequences, and modernised archaic spellings to reflect modern pronunciation but it also removed letters pronounced in one dialect but not in another. Some words may have dialectal pronunciations not reflected by their standard spelling, they may have dialectal spellings to reflect this.

Alphabet
Latin script has been the writing system used to write Irish since the 5th century, when it replaced Ogham which was used to write Primitive Irish and Old Irish. Prior the mid-20th century Gaelic type was the main typeface used to write Irish, now it is usually replaced by Roman type. The use of Ogham and Gaelic type today is restricted to decorative or self-consciously traditional contexts. The dot above a lenited letter in Gaelic type is usually replaced by a following  in Roman type (e.g.  → ).

Letters and letter names

The traditional Irish alphabet consists of 18 letters: . It does not contain , although they are used in scientific terminology and modern loanwords/words of foreign origin.  occurs in a small number of (mainly onomatopoeic) native words (e.g. , when not prefixed to a word initial vowel to show aspiration or after a consonant to show lenition, primarily occurs word initially in loanwords, e.g. "hat".  is the only letter not listed by Ó Dónaill. 

Vowels may be accented with an acute accent (see below). Accented letters are considered variants of their unaccented equivalent so they are ignored for purposes of alphabetisation, they follow their unaccented equivalents in dictionaries (i.e.

English letter names are generally used in colloquial and formal speech but there are modern Irish letter names (based on the original Latin names), similar to other languages that use a Latin script alphabet. Tree names were historically used to name the letters. Tradition taught that they all derived from the names of Ogham letters, though it is now known that only some of the earliest were named after trees.

Grapheme to phoneme correspondence 

In the consonant table, 1 and 2 stand for broad and slender, respectively, while in the vowel tables they stand for stressed and unstressed. Initially and finally mean word initial or final unless stated otherwise. The IPA transcriptions of examples on this page are in Connacht Irish.

Consonants 
The consonant letters generally correspond to the consonant phonemes as shown in this table. See Irish phonology for an explanation of the symbols used and Irish initial mutations for an explanation of eclipsis and lenition. In most cases, consonants are "broad" (velarised) when beside  and "slender" (palatalised) when beside .

Vowels 
Sequences of vowels are common in Irish spelling due to the "" ("slender with slender and broad with broad") rule. This rule states that the vowels on either side of any consonant must be both slender or both broad, to unambiguously determine if the consonant(s) are broad or slender.

Pronunciation of vowels in Irish is mostly predictable from a few simple rules:

 Accented vowels are always long vowels and in digraphs and trigraphs containing them, surrounding unaccented vowels tend to be silent, but there are several exceptions, e.g. when preceded by two unaccented vowels.
 Accented vowels in succession are both pronounced, e.g.   "sixth",   "royal, kingly, majestic",   "sympathy", etc.
  is silent before  and after a vowel (except sometimes in ).
  is silent before a broad vowel.
  have multiple pronunciations that depend on adjacent consonants.
 A following  lengthens some vowels and in Munster and Connacht a following syllable-final  or word-final  may lengthen or diphthongise some vowels depending on dialect.

Followed by  
For , see also Exceptions in verb forms.

Epenthesis 
"blue",   "red",   "dark",   "name",   "prickly, thorny"’   "child",   "silver, money".

Epenthesis does not occur after long vowels and diphthongs, e.g.   "term" or   "duty", or across morpheme boundaries (i.e. after prefixes and in compound words), e.g.   "grandson" (from  "close, near" +  "son"),   "very quiet" (from  "very" +  "quiet"),   "carriageway, roadway" (from  "car" +  "way, road").

Exceptions in verb forms 
In verb forms, some letters and letter combinations are pronounced differently from elsewhere.

Diacritics

 currently uses one diacritic, the acute accent, though traditionally a second was used, the overdot. If diacritics are unavailable, e.g. on a computer using ASCII, the overdot is replaced by a following , e.g.  →  "He/It was" and there is no standard for replacing an acute accent.

The acute accent (or  "long (sign)") is used to indicate a long vowel, as in   "boat". However, there are other conventions to indicate a long vowel, such as:

 A following , e.g.   "high",   "destruction",   "fist", and, in Connacht, a word-final , e.g.   "time".
 The digraphs , e.g.   "gay",   "bare",   "music".
 The tri/tetragraphs , e.g.   "neighbour",   "Munster".
"wild",   "twine".

The overdot ("dot of lenition",  "struck", or  "lenition") was traditionally used to indicate lenition, though  uses a following  for this purpose. Later the two methods were used in parallel to represent the lenition of any consonant and competed with each other until the standard practice became to use the overdot in Gaelic type and the following  in Roman type.

Lowercase  has no tittle in Gaelic type, and road signs in the Republic of Ireland. However, as printed and electronic material like books, newspapers and web pages use Roman type almost invariably, the tittle is generally shown. Irish does not graphemically distinguish dotted i and dotless ı, i.e. they are not different letters as they are in, e.g. Turkish and Azeri.

Punctuation

Irish punctuation is similar to English. An apparent exception is the Tironian et which abbreviates the word  "and", like the ampersand abbreviates "and" in English. It is generally substituted by a seven in texts.

A hyphen is used in Irish after  when prefixed to a masculine vowel-initial word as an initial mutation, e.g.  "the bread",  "their daughter". However, it is omitted when the vowel is capitalised, e.g.  "the Scotsman",  "Our Father". No hyphen is used when  is prefixed to a vowel-initial word, e.g.  "her daughter".

A hyphen is also used in compound words under certain circumstances:

 between two vowels, e.g.  "misfortune"
 between two similar consonants, e.g.  "bad language",  "prompt payment"
 in a three-part compound, e.g.  "permanent joint committee"
"bad tasting",  "subsume",  "mortality"
 in capitalised titles, e.g.  "the Chief Justice"
 after  "very" and  "good", e.g.  "very big",  "goodwill"

An apostrophe is used to indicate an omitted vowel in the following cases:

 the prepositions  "from" and  "to" both become  before a vowel or  + vowel, as in  "She fell from a horse" and  "Give it to the landlord"
 the possessive pronouns  "my" and  "your (singular)" become  and  before a vowel or  + vowel, as in  "my youth",  "your tooth"
 the preverbal particle  becomes  before a vowel or  + vowel, as in  "I raised",  "he would wait"
 the copular particle  becomes  before a vowel or  + vowel, as in  "I found that odd" and  "maybe".

Capitalisation

Capitalisation rules are similar to English. However, a prefixed letter remains in lowercase when the base initial is capitalised ( "China"). For text written in all caps, the prefixed letter is kept in lowercase, or small caps ( "THE HISTORY OF IRELAND"). An initial capital is used for:

 Start of sentences
 Names of people, places (except the words ,), languages ,and adjectives of people and places ( "Michael Murphy";  "Mary McEntee";  "Burke";  "Slievenamon";  "French";  "Italian food")
 Names of months, weeks and feast-days ( "September";  "Monday";  "Christmas Eve")
  "day" ( "on Monday")
 Definite titles

Abbreviations
Most Irish abbreviations in are straightforward, e.g.  →  ("page → p.") and  →  (" (for example) → e.g."), but two that require explanation are:  →  ("that is → i.e.") and  →  ("et cetera (and so forth) → &c./etc."). Like  in English,  follows an ordinal numeral, e.g.  "St. Patrick’s day is the 17th [day] of March".

Spelling reform
The literary Classical Irish which survived till the 17th century was archaic; the first attempt at simplification was not until 1639. The spelling represented a dialect continuum including distinctions lost in all surviving dialects by the Gaelic revival of the late 19th century.

The idea of a spelling reform, linked to the use of Roman or Gaelic type, was controversial in the early decades of the 20th century. The Irish Texts Society's 1904 Irish-English dictionary by Patrick S. Dinneen used traditional spellings. After the creation of the Irish Free State in 1922, all Acts of the Oireachtas were translated into Irish, initially using Dinneen's spellings, with a list of simplifications accumulating over the years. When Éamon de Valera became President of the Executive Council after the 1932 election, policy reverted to older spellings, which were used in the enrolled text of the 1937 Constitution. In 1941, de Valera decided to publish a "popular edition" of the Constitution with simplified spelling and established a committee of experts, which failed to agree on recommendations. Instead, the Oireachtas' own translation service prepared a booklet, published in 1945.

Some pre-reform spellings criticised by T. F. O'Rahilly and their modern forms include:  → ,  → ,  → ,  → ,  → .

The booklet was expanded in 1947, and republished as  "The Official Standard" in 1958, combined with the standard grammar of 1953. It attracted initial criticism as unhistorical and artificial; some spellings fail to represent the pronunciation of some dialects, while others preserve letters unpronounced in any dialect. Its status was reinforced by use in the civil service and as a guide for Tomás de Bhaldraithe's 1959 English–Irish dictionary and Niall Ó Dónaill's 1977 Irish–English dictionary. A review of the written standard, including spelling, was announced in 2010, aiming to improve "simplicity, internal consistency, and logic". The result was the 2017 update of An Caighdeán Oifigiúil.

See also
 Irish Braille
 Irish manual alphabet
 Gaelic type
 Roman type
 Scottish Gaelic orthography

Notes
  Vowels with an acute accent are read as [á/é/í/ó/ú]  "long [á/é/í/ó/ú]".
  -- is  after  ( are deleted before it is added). It is  after  which are deleted before it is added.

References

Bibliography

 

Orthography
Indo-European Latin-script orthographies